"Cute (I'm Not Cute!)" is a song performed by Polish band Blog 27 from their 2008 album Before I'll Die....

Overview
The song was written by the band's leader Tola Szlagowska who also co-produced it with Agnieszka Burcan and Paweł Radziszewski of the Polish band Plastic. It had its radio premiere on 10 March 2008 and was released as a digital download single in Poland only. The song and its music video received a four-star review from the American music magazine Blender.

Music video
The song's music video was filmed in March and released on 10 April 2008. It was directed by Anna Maliszewska.

Track listing
Digital download
"Cute (I'm Not Cute!)" – 3:09

References

2008 songs
2008 singles
Blog 27 songs